Jinju National Museum is a national museum located in the Jinju fortress (진주성 晉州城), Jinju, South Korea. It opened in February 1984 with the purpose to specialize the theme of Imjinwaeran.

See also
List of museums in South Korea
National museum
Japanese invasions of Korea (1592–1598)

References

External links
 Jinju National Museum Official Site 
 Jinju National Museum official youtube

National museums of South Korea
Jinju
Museums in South Gyeongsang Province
Museums established in 1984
1984 establishments in South Korea